This is a list of notable venues where jazz music is played. It includes jazz clubs, clubs, dancehalls and historic venues such as theatres. A jazz club is a venue where the primary entertainment is the performance of live jazz music. Jazz clubs are usually a type of nightclub or bar, which is licensed to sell alcoholic beverages. Jazz clubs were in large rooms in the eras of Orchestral jazz and big band jazz, when bands were large and often augmented by a string section. Large rooms were also more common in the Swing era, because at that time, jazz was popular as a dance music, so the dancers needed space to move. With the transition to 1940s-era styles like Bebop and later styles such as soul jazz, small combos of musicians such as quartets and trios were mostly used, and the music became more of a music to listen to, rather than a form of dance music. As a result, smaller clubs with small stages became practical.

In the 2000s, jazz clubs may be found in the basements of larger residential buildings, in storefront locations or in the upper floors of retail businesses. They can be rather small compared to other music venues, such as rock music clubs, reflecting the intimate atmosphere of jazz shows and long-term decline in popular interest in jazz. Despite being called "clubs", these venues are usually not exclusive. Some clubs, however, have a cover charge if a live band is playing. Some jazz clubs host "jam sessions" after hours or on early evenings of the week. At jam sessions, both professional musicians and advanced amateurs will typically share the stage.

Belgium

Antwerp 
 Antwerp Jazz Club (AJC)

Brussels 
 Hot Club of Belgium
 Jazz Station
 nl:L'Archiduc

Canada

Toronto 
 Colonial Tavern
 George's Spaghetti House
 Town Tavern

Denmark 
 Jazzhus Montmartre, Copenhagen

France

Paris 

 Le Baiser Salé
 Le Caveau de la Huchette
 Le Chat Qui Pêche
 Le Duc des Lombards
 New Morning
 Sunset/Sunside

Marseille
La Caravelle

Germany

Berlin 
 A-Trane
 B-flat

Cologne 
 The Loft
 Subway

Frankfurt 
Jazzkeller Frankfurt

Hamburg 
 Birdland
 Mojo Club

Munich
Jazzclub Unterfahrt

Italy 
 Blue Note, Milan

Japan 
 Pit Inn, Tokyo

Netherlands 
 Bimhuis, Amsterdam
 Porgy & Bess, Terneuzen

Portugal 
 Hot Club of Portugal, Lisbon

Turkey 
 Shaft, Istanbul

United Kingdom 
 The Concorde Club, Eastleigh, Hampshire
 Oxford University Jazz Society, Oxford
 Redcar Jazz Club, Redcar

Bristol 
 East Bristol Jazz Club

London 
 606 Club
 Club Eleven
 Ealing Jazz Club
 Jazz Café
 Le QuecumBar
 Ronnie Scott's Jazz Club
 The Bull's Head (Barnes)
 Vortex Jazz Club
 PizzaExpress Jazz Club

Manchester 
 Band on the Wall
 Matt and Phreds

United States 

 Artists' Quarter, Saint Paul, Minnesota
 Baker's Keyboard Lounge, Detroit
 Birdland
 Blue Note
 Blue Whale, Los Angeles
 Blues Alley, Washington, DC
 The Bottom Line
 Café Bohemia
 Café Society
 Carnegie Hall
 Colored Musicians Club, Buffalo, New York
 Condon's
 Cotton Club
 Dakota Jazz Club
 Dimitriou's Jazz Alley
 Five Spot
 Keystone Korner, Baltimore, MD
 Lulu White's Mahogany Hall, Storyville, New Orleans
 Nick's
 Preservation Hall, French Quarter, New Orleans
 Regal Theater
 Ryles Jazz Club, Cambridge
 Savoy Ballroom
 Smalls Jazz Club
 Tipitina's, Uptown, New Orleans
 The Village Gate
 Village Vanguard
Yoshi's, Oakland

See also

 Jazz club
 List of jazz festivals
 List of concert halls
 List of contemporary amphitheatres
 List of opera houses

References

External links 
 Jazz Near You: 20,000 venue listings

Jazz
+
Venues